The Columbus Circle globe is a sculpture of a globe by Kim Brandell, installed outside Trump International Hotel and Tower at Columbus Circle in Manhattan, New York City. The globe is a homage to the Unisphere, located in Donald Trump's home borough of Queens. Prior to installation, Brandell held a party for the sculpture at her studios in South Beach, Miami.

References

External links

 
 Photograph by Carol M. Highsmith, Library of Congress

Columbus Circle
Outdoor sculptures in Manhattan
Upper West Side